Herzl Fritzner was an Israeli footballer and manager, who played for Maccabi Rehovot, Maccabi Tel Aviv, Hapoel Tel Aviv and Hapoel Ramat Gan and coached Maccabi Ramat Amidar and Hapoel Ramat Gan.

Biography
Fritzner was born in Kiev in 1919 and moved with his family to the Netherlands when he was 5. As a teenager, Fritzner was sent to a boarding school in Düsseldorf, where he played for the local Maccabi club. In 1935, Fritzner immigrated to Palestine on his own, with the Youth Aliyah organization and settled at Kibbutz Na'an. While at the Kibbutz, Fritzner represented the local Hapoel club in athletics, with his main event being the shot put, in which he set a Hapoel junior record of 11.39 m in 1937.

In 1938, Fritzner moved to Rehovot, where he worked in the Jewish Settlement Police and joined the local Maccabi club. While continuing to compete in Athletics, excelling in shot put and javelin throw, Fritzner started playing football with Maccabi Rehovot in Liga Bet. As a member of the settlement police, Fritzner was drafted into the regional police football team, Sarona Police, which competed and won the Settlement Police Cup.  The police team also competed, along with other Maccabi clubs, in the Maccabi Ersatz League, and as the police team was disbanded, Fritzner joined Maccabi Tel Aviv.

Fritzner stayed at Maccabi Tel Aviv until 1946, winning one championship and two cups, scoring a goal in the 1941 Palestine Cup final. In 1946, Fritzner moved to Hapoel Ramat Gan for one season, after which he transferred to Hapoel Tel Aviv, where he stayed until 1953. Fritzner played until his retirement with Hapoel Ramat Gan, while also coaching Ramat Gan club Maccabi Ramat Amidar. During the 1959–60 season, Fritzner was appointed as head coach for Hapoel Ramat Gan, but didn't manage to save the club from relegation. Fritzner stayed with the club in its first season in Liga Alef, after which he was replaced by Moshe Varon and retired from football altogether.

Honours
League Championships (1):
 1939–40
Cup (2):
1941, 1946

External links
Herzl Fritzner Hapoel Wiki

References

1919 births
2007 deaths
Mandatory Palestine people
Ukrainian Jews
Dutch Jews
Israeli Jews
Jewish Dutch sportspeople
Israeli footballers
Hermes DVS players
Maccabi Rehovot F.C. players
Maccabi Tel Aviv F.C. players
Hapoel Ramat Gan F.C. players
Hapoel Tel Aviv F.C. players
Maccabi Ramat Amidar F.C. managers
Hapoel Ramat Gan F.C. managers
Association football forwards
Israeli football managers
Soviet emigrants to Mandatory Palestine